Earl L. Harris (November 8, 1941 – March 23, 2015) was an American politician who served as a member of the Indiana House of Representatives from 1982 to 2015.

Education
He attended Indiana University, Purdue University, and the Illinois Institute of Technology.

Career
Prior to his political career, he served as the fixed assets administrator for the East Chicago School Corp. He also served for six years in the United States Navy Reserve.

Harris was elected to the Indiana House of Representatives in 1982. He served until his death in 2015. His wife, Donna Harris, was elected to succeed him in the House on April 18, 2015. His son, Earl Harris Jr., succeeded her in the House. During his tenure, Harris was a member of the Indiana Black Legislative Caucus.

References

External links
Indiana State Legislature - Representative Earl Harris official Indiana State Legislature site

 

Democratic Party members of the Indiana House of Representatives
People from East Chicago, Indiana
People from Shelby County, Tennessee
Illinois Institute of Technology alumni
Indiana University alumni
Purdue University alumni
1941 births
2015 deaths
African-American state legislators in Indiana
20th-century African-American people
21st-century African-American people